Melaleuca biconvexa is a tree or shrub in the myrtle family, Myrtaceae and is endemic to coastal areas of New South Wales. The leaves have a distinctive, wing-like shape and the flowers are in white or cream-coloured heads at the ends of its branches. It is classified as a vulnerable species.

Description
The leaves are distinctive in having the mid-vein in a groove with either side of the leaf blade curving up wing-like from this vein.

The stamens are arranged in five bundles around the flower with 10 to 20 stamens per bundle.

Taxonomy and naming
Melaleuca boconvexa was first formally described in 1984 by Norman Byrnes in the journal Austrobaileya. The specific epithet (biconvexa) refers to the shape of the leaves in cross section.

The name Melaleuca pauciflora Turcz. was misapplied to this taxon for many years before Byrnes's 1984 paper.

Distribution and habitat
This melaleuca occurs in scattered populations in coastal areas from Port Macquarie to Jervis Bay. It grows in damp places, often near streams or low-lying areas, often in eucalypt forest on sandy alluvial soil, on low slopes and sheltered places.

Conservation status
Melaleuca biconvexa is able to resprout after fire but faces a number of threats to its survival including land clearing, alteration of drainage patterns and swamp reclamation, grazing and trampling by stock and competition from noxious aquatic weeds such as Sagittaria platyphylla. Most populations are on private land, making conservation efforts difficult and the species has been classified as vulnerable under the Biodiversity Conservation Act 2016.

References

biconvexa
Flora of New South Wales
Myrtales of Australia
Vulnerable flora of Australia
Plants described in 1984
Taxa named by Norman Brice Byrnes